Kerry Wilkinson is an Australian former professional tennis player.

Wilkinson's best performance in a grand slam tournament was a third round appearance at the 1970 Australian Open, where she was beaten by the top seed and eventual champion Margaret Court.

References

External links
 
 

Year of birth missing (living people)
Living people
Australian female tennis players